, The Great Picture (111 feet (34 m) wide and 32 feet (9.8 m) high) holds the Guinness World Record for the largest print photograph, and the camera with which it was made holds a record for being the world's largest. The photograph was taken in 2006 as part of the Legacy Project, a photographic compilation and record of the history of Marine Corps Air Station El Toro as it is being transformed into the Orange County Great Park. The project used the abandoned F-18 hangar #115 at the closed fighter base in Irvine, California, United States, as the world's largest pinhole camera. The aim was to make a black-and-white negative print of the Marine Corps air station with its control tower and runways, with the San Joaquin Hills in the background. The photograph was unveiled on July 12, 2006, during a reception held in the hangar and was exhibited for the first time at the Art Center College of Design in Pasadena, California, on September 6, 2007.

Construction of the pinhole camera

The camera measured 160 ft (48.76 m) wide x 45 ft (13.71 m) high x 80 ft (24.38 m) deep.

The distance between the pinhole and the cloth was determined to be  for best coverage, and the exposure time was calculated at 35 minutes.

Development

The hangar-turned-camera recorded a panoramic image of what was on the other side of the door using the centuries-old principle of "camera obscura" or pinhole camera. An image of the former El Toro Marine Corps Air Station appeared upside down and flipped left to right on film after being projected through the tiny hole in the hangar's metal door.

The photograph was then washed using fire hoses attached to two fire hydrants.

Exhibitions
The Great Picture has been exhibited in the following venues:
 The Great Picture Unveiling on July 12, 2006, in hangar #115 (where it was taken) in Irvine, California.
 The Great Picture on September 6–29, 2007 at the Art Center College of Design in Pasadena, California.
 The Great Picture: The World's largest Photograph on March 8–27, 2011 at the Art Museum, Central Academy of Fine Arts in Beijing, China.
 The Great Picture: The World's largest Photograph & The Legacy Project on July 16 – October 8, 2011 at the Culver Center of the Arts and Sweeney Art Gallery/University of California, Riverside in Riverside, California.
 The Great Picture: The World's largest Photograph & The Legacy Project at the Contemporary Arts Center (New Orleans) on November 23 – December 15, 2013.
 The National Air and Space Museum of the Smithsonian Institution, April–November 2014.

See also
List of largest photographs in the world

References

Further reading
Photographic Possibilities, Third Edition, Robert Hirsch; 304 pages; January, 2009; published by Focal Press, Oxford, England.
The Book of Alternative Photographic Processes, Second Edition, Christopher James; 660 pages; February, 2008; published by Thomson Delmar Publishing, Clifton Park, New York. 
Pinhole Photography: From Historic Technique to Digital Application, Fourth Edition, Eric Renner; 272 pages; November, 2007; published by Focal Press, Oxford, England.

External links
The Legacy Photo Project
Contemporary Art Dialogue

2006 works
2006 in art
2006 in California
Black-and-white photographs
Photographs of the United States
Culture of Irvine, California
History of Irvine, California
World record holders
2000s photographs